Catalimonas is a genus of bacteria.

References

Cytophagia
Bacteria genera